Trevor Bentham (born 11 October 1943) is a British former stage manager and screenwriter (A Month by the Lake and The Clandestine Marriage).

For 22 years, he was the partner of British actor Sir Nigel Hawthorne. They met in 1968 when Bentham was stage-managing the Royal Court Theatre.

From 1979 until Hawthorne's death in 2001, they lived together in Radwell near Baldock and latterly at Thundridge, both in Hertfordshire, England. The two were fundraisers for Garden House Hospice in Letchworth, Herts hospice and other local charities.

Bentham was diagnosed with muscular dystrophy in 1997.

References

External links
 

1943 births
English screenwriters
English male screenwriters
British LGBT screenwriters
English LGBT writers
Living people
People with muscular dystrophy
British gay writers